Bhaskar Bharti is an Indian fantasy comedy-drama television series that aired on Sony Entertainment Television. It premiered on 25 May 2009 and stars Ragini Khanna, Anchal Sabharwal, Aamir Ali, Jai Kalra, Rukhsar Rehman, Vivek Mushran and Eijaz Khan.

Prior to its launch, it was believed that Bhaskar Bharti was a TV adaptation of the 2005 Hindi film Mr Ya Miss. However, that was not the case, as it is actually a Hindi adaptation of the popular Argentine comedy show Lalola in which a man turns into a woman as a result of being cursed by one of his love interests.

Synopsis
The story is centred around the life of Bhaskar (portrayed by Eijaz Khan), an attractive and debonair man and chief editor of Men's Universe, a fledgling men's magazine. He's quite popular among women; however, he keeps moving in and out of relationships, as he doesn't believe in the concept of love. Eventually, one of his ex-girlfriends (whom he promised to marry) curses him to turn into a woman, so that he may understand the pain and anguish that he has caused her and other women. The curse comes true, and Bhaskar transforms into a woman that night (portrayed by Ragini Khanna).

Bewildered by this sudden change, he tries in vain to turn himself back into a man. He soon realizes that he has no choice but to continue his daily life as a woman until the curse can be reversed. To be accepted back in his workplace, he pretends to be Bhaskar's cousin Bharti and lies that Bhaskar had to leave to attend to a family emergency, and that he has asked her to assume his responsibilities at his office until he returns. He is able to get his job back as a result, but realizes that getting everyone's respect and attention will prove very difficult, more so now as he is a woman. No one except his best friend, Payal, knows about this, and Bhaskar and Payal together attempt to bring Bhasker back to his original body.

Cast

Main cast
 Ragini Khanna  as Bhaskar Bharti, mainly known as Bharti Bhaskar, Bhaskar's female Avatar, who is continuously trapped in problems and solves them.
 Anchal Sabharwal as Payal Mehra, She is Bhaskar's best friend, who loves him and wants him back in his original self. She is constantly with him through this tumultuous phase of his life, and helps him in dealing with his new body and new personal and professional life. She works in a Radio Station.
 Aamir Ali as Armaan Sinha, Bhaskar's office colleague. He is in love with Bharti, The female version of Bhaskar. He is a divorcé with a young daughter, and is shown as a good and kind person by heart.
 Eijaz Khan as Bhaskar, He originally stars as a guest and makes small appearances in some episodes. He is the chief editor of Men's Universe magazine, and hails originally from Gwalior, a playboy man.

Recurring cast
 Vivek Mushran as Amarjeet Chaddha, Bhaskar (Bharti)'s boss. He is initially biased against Bharti and doubts her capabilities, but is gradually forced to accept her contributions towards the magazine's success.
 Jai Kalra as Gyaan Gupta, Bhaskar's office colleague and supposed best friend. Gyaan, however, is very jealous of Both Bharti and Bhaskar but is in an open fight with Bharti. He and Vineeta try often to get her thrown out of her job, but without result.
 Rukhsar Rehman as Vineeta Lamba, Gyaan's subordinate in office and also his love interest. She conspires with Gyaan to have Bharti thrown out from the magazine, so he can assume Bhaskar's post and she can be promoted to his current post.
 Rajesh Khera as KK, the mysterious man who is responsible for Bhaskar's transformation into Bharti. He is later revealed to be none other than Lord Krishna (KK apparently being short for "Krishna Kanhaiya"). Bhaskar is seen in his male form only when KK is with him.
 Mohit Daga as Nanhe

Guest cast
 Preeti Amin as Geeta, A simple Girl. Bhaskar promised to marry her but left her at last moment. In anger she asked God to teach Bhaskar the respect of women, Resulting in his transformation from a man to a woman.
 Shakti Anand as Omkar Sinha, Armaan's Elder brother. He claims that he is Bharti's husband.
 Kurush Deboo as Dr. Vibhushan Nath Chakrapani Baba. A spiritual con baba dupes Bharti with a false claim to make her Bhaskar (the male) again with the help of his chemicals and holy mantras book.
 Kanika Kohli as Armaan's Ex-Wife

References

External links
 

Sony Entertainment Television original programming
2009 Indian television series debuts
2009 Indian television series endings
Indian television soap operas
Indian television series based on non-Indian television series